The 2009–10 Texas A&M Aggies men's basketball team represented Texas A&M University in the 2009-10 NCAA Division I men's basketball season. The team was led by third-year head coach Mark Turgeon, who coached the team to a 24–10 record and an NCAA tournament appearance in the previous season. The Aggies play their home games in Reed Arena. The team was picked to finish fifth in the Big 12 in the preseason coaches' poll but finished tied for second. With their 22–8 regular-season finish and 11–5 mark in conference play, the Aggies participated in the 2010 Big 12 men's basketball tournament and defeated Nebraska before losing to No. 1 Kansas in the semifinals. They received an at–large bid to the 2010 NCAA Division I men's basketball tournament and earned a 5 seed in the South Region. They defeated 12 seed Utah State in the first round before falling to 4 seed Purdue in overtime in the second round to finish their season at 24–10. In the final Coaches' Poll, the Aggies were ranked No. 25.

Pre-season
Nearly all of the contributors from the previous year's NCAA Tournament second-round team returned for the Aggies, including seniors Donald Sloan, Derrick Roland and Bryan Davis, along with juniors B.J. Holmes and Nathan Walkup and sophomores David Loubeau and Dash Harris. Despite that, the Aggies began the year unranked. A&M faced a much tougher non-conference schedule than they had played in recent years, featuring a trip to Los Angeles for the 76 Classic. Among the other participants in the tournament were nationally ranked West Virginia, Butler, Minnesota and Clemson. Their other marquee matchup before the beginning of conference play was scheduled against the preseason-No. 14 Washington Huskies. Though the Aggies were not ranked in any major poll, they received votes in both the AP and Coaches' polls.

Departures
The main factors contributing to A&M's being unranked in the preseason were the departures of senior guard Josh Carter—the winningest player in Aggie basketball history—and junior post player Chinemelu Elonu, two of the team's starters the previous year. Carter graduated and signed a contract to play in Germany, while Elonu was drafted in the second round of the NBA draft. The loss of Elonu, who along with Bryan Davis constituted much of the Aggies' inside game, was tabbed as being especially detrimental to the team's hopes for success as the 2009-10 season began.

Recruiting
In 2008 the Aggies received commitments from four-star rated Naji Hibbert and three-star prospects Khris Middleton, Kourtney Roberson and Ray Turner. They later added Jeremy Adams to a class that narrowly missed being ranked in the top 25 classes nationally by ESPN. Roberson was later declared ineligible and, after waiting one year, will join the nationally ranked A&M class of 2010. Turner was ineligible for the fall semester and joined the team in January, bringing an immediate impact. While Hibbert, who was the prize recruit of the class, contributed in many ways as a freshman, it was Middleton, called the best-shooting forward in the high school class of 2009 by many, who later became a starter and threw his name into the ring as a potential future star for the Aggies.

Class of 2009

|-
| colspan="7" style="padding-left:10px;" | Overall Recruiting Rankings:     Scout – NR     Rivals – NR       ESPN – 27 
|}

Roster

Schedule

|-
!colspan=9| Exhibition

|-
!colspan=9| Regular season

|-
!colspan=10| 2010 Big 12 men's basketball tournament

|-
!colspan=10| 2010 NCAA Division I men's basketball tournament

Derrick Roland
On December 22, 2009, senior guard Derrick Roland broke the tibia and fibula in his right leg early in the second half of the Aggies' game against Washington. After going up for a rebound, he came down awkwardly, his leg emitting a loud crack that was heard throughout the arena. The leg bent outwards at a ninety-degree angle in the middle of his shin. Many of the Aggies began crying on the court at the sight, including Roland's childhood friend, senior guard Donald Sloan, who had to be helped off of the court. Pondexter called it "One of the nastiest things I've ever seen." Turgeon said, "Derrick was the heart and soul of this team. Everyone is devastated. Our guys had their eyes swollen in the last five minutes of the game. They were crying during the game. They never came out of it." The Aggies, who were shaken, stumbled to a 73-64 defeat. After the loss, the previously No. 19 Aggies (in the AP poll) dropped out of the rankings and did not re-enter until February 15, 2010. Roland was treated in a Seattle-area hospital before returning to Texas. At the time of his injury, he was averaging 11.1 points per game, second on the team, and had been named to the All-Big 12 Defensive Team the year before. Roland's injury significantly altered the course and prospects of the Aggies' season.

In A&M's conference play-opening win against Nebraska, Roland returned to the team bench on crutches and watched his teammates play in person for the first time since his injury. Despite missing one of their team captains, their best defender and a viable scoring option—or perhaps using it as motivation—the Aggies continued on to a 22-8 regular-season record and an 11-5 conference record, tied for second in the Big 12. The team became a mainstay in the top 15 of the RPI and ranked in both the AP and Coaches' polls for the entirety of the second half of the season. Roland's quick progression in his recovery led to rumors that he may have been able to return to the team, able to play, in time for the Big 12 tournament or the NCAA tournament, but Texas A&M was reluctant to feed speculation regarding the possibilities and no situation in which he could enter a game ever materialized.

On March 3, 2010, Roland was honored along with fellow seniors Donald Sloan and Bryan Davis at the Aggies' Senior Night before and after Texas A&M's win against Oklahoma State in their last home game of the season. The Aggies' season ended in the second round of the 2010 NCAA Tournament with a loss to fourth-seeded Purdue, and it was announced that coach Mark Turgeon would help Roland pursue a medical redshirt in order to return to the team for the 2010-11 season.

"He's always thought about it, but the thing about it is there is no guarantee," Turgeon said. "Let's just say we're going to try to get him a redshirt year. I'm not going to sit here and fight it in the media. It's something we are going to try. He wants to try but we are fighting an uphill battle on this one."

Rankings

Note: Team received votes in every poll for which they were unranked, with the exception of Week 12.

References

Texas A&M Aggies men's basketball seasons
Texas AandM
Texas AandM